Russel Braddock Ward AM (9 November 1914 – 13 August 1995) was an Australian historian best known for writing The Australian Legend (1958), an examination of the development of the "Australian character", which was awarded the Ernest Scott Prize.

Early life and education

His parents were Florence Winifred Ward, née Braddock and John Frederick Ward, a teacher. Russel attended three schools at which his father worked. In the early 1920s, his father joined the staff of Thornburgh College, in Charters Towers, Queensland. In 1923, J. F. Ward was appointed founding headmaster of Wesley College, Perth. Russel completed his schooling at Prince Alfred College (PAC), Adelaide after his father became headmaster there in the early 1930s. At PAC Ward was a busy student, serving as prefect and on numerous committees including debating, rowing, christian union, cadets and historical society of which he was president.

Early career

Ward studied English at the University of Adelaide and taught at Geelong and Sydney Grammar Schools. During World War II he served in an army psychological unit. Ward's membership of the Communist Party of Australia (1941 to 1949) brought him to the attention of ASIO; and, in 1984, he appeared before the Hope Royal Commission on Australia's security and intelligence agencies stating that ASIO had harassed him for 40 years.

Academic career

Ward was at the University of New England as a lecturer in the 1950s and deputy chancellor for eight years.

In his book, The Australian Legend, Ward argued that the Australian bush was egalitarian and that this influenced Australian culture. Ward's book was both influential and controversial and is grouped among the classic historical references on Australia history. In the 40 years since its first publication, there were three editions and it has been reprinted 15 times. While the images of the Australian character in Legend may not seem to reflect modern views, it is a book that "inform[s] Australians about the forces that have shaped them", and it raises questions that continue to be debated.

His thesis in Legend was later challenged by Humphrey McQueen in 1970. It would influence the development of the Australian New Left.

In the 1986 Queen's Birthday honours Ward was made a Member of the Order of Australia (AM) for "service to literature, particularly in the field of Australian history".

Ward died in Texas, Queensland on August 13, 1995, at the home of his partner, Jeané Upjohn.

Legacy

The Russel Ward Annual Lecture was established in his honour by the University of New England in 1986.

Bibliography
  Felons and folksongs (1955) Canberra University College, Canberra
 The Australian Legend (1958) Oxford University Press, Melbourne
Australia (1967) Ure Smith, Sydney
 A Nation for a Continent: the history of Australia, 1901–1975 (1977) Heinemann Educational Australia, Richmond
 Australia Since the Coming of Man (1982) Lansdowne Press, Sydney
 Finding Australia: the history of Australia to 1821 (1987) Heinemann Educational Australia, Richmond
 A Radical Life: The Autobiography of Russel Ward, (1988) MacMillan, South Melbourne, Australia

See also
ANZAC spirit & Mateship
Culture of Australia
History wars

References

1914 births
1995 deaths
Australian memoirists
Australian military personnel of World War II
Australian soldiers
Members of the Order of Australia
People from Adelaide
Academic staff of the University of New England (Australia)
20th-century Australian historians
20th-century memoirists